Al-Harth is a sub-district located in Ba'dan District, Ibb Governorate, Yemen. Al-Harth had a population of 20039 as of 2004.

References 

Sub-districts in Ba'dan District